Roy Helton (April 3, 1886 – December 1977) was an American poet and novelist. His poems include "In Passing" and "Old Christmas Morning".

He was a poet, novelist, educator and public servant. He and his wife Anna Friend Watson and their sons Robert and Frank lived near Philadelphia, Pennsylvania. Helton taught at Friends Central School and worked for the Pennsylvania State Planning Commission. He wrote for the Atlantic Monthly and other magazines.

Works
His works include:
 
Poetry collections:
 Youth's Pilgrimage, 1915
 Outcasts in Beulah Land, 1918
 Lonesome Water, 1930
 Come Back To Earth, 1946

Novels:
 Jimmy Sharswood, 1924
 The Early Adventures of Peacham Grew, 1925 (with drawings by Edward Shenton)
 Nitchey Tilley, 1934 (published in UK as "Their Own Day")

Non-fiction:
 Sold Out To The Future (1935)

References

External links
Poems online:
"In Passing" at www.bartleby.com
"Old Christmas Morning" at www.oldpoetry.com
Roy Helton on Worldcat

1886 births
1977 deaths
20th-century American poets